The 27th Billboard Latin Music Awards ceremony, presented by Billboard magazine, honored the best performing Latin recordings, charting from February 2, 2019, to January 25, 2020. The ceremony was held on October 21, 2020, at the BB&T Center in Sunrise, in the periphery of Miami. The ceremony was televised in the United States by Telemundo for the 22nd time. The Billboard Latin Music Awards closed out LatinFest+, presented by Billboard and Telemundo, a three-day immersive experience dedicated to Latin music, culture and entertainment. Celebrating its 30th anniversary, the formerly known as Billboard Latin Music Week, included virtual superstar conversations and workshops with, among others, Ozuna, Rosalía, Maluma, Black Eyed Peas, Carlos Vives and Los Tigres del Norte between October 20 and 23. The awards recognize the most popular Latin performers, songs, albums, labels, songwriters and producers in the United States. Recipients are based on sales, radio airplay, online streaming and social data during a one-year period.

Background
Despite many producers being in talks to hold the gala at the Fibes Auditorium in Seville in May following the success of the MTV Europe Music Awards and the excitement of many artists to play there, on February 5, 2020, Billboard announced the nominations for the award ceremony and revealed that it would take place on April 23 at Mandalay Bay Events Center in Las Vegas while LatinFest + was scheduled to be held at The Venetian featuring speeches, debates and live performances. On March 17, Billboard agreed to postpone the gala following the Nevada Governor's recommendations to limit the size of public gatherings for the prevention and containment of COVID-19 in the United States.

On August 24, Billboard announced that the Latin Music Awards would be taking place in Miami on October 21. Nominations were not changed.

Performers

Nominees

The nominees for the 27th Billboard Latin Music Awards were announced on February 5, 2020. Ozuna and Bad Bunny led the nominations with 14 each. Daddy Yankee and J Balvin both received 12 nominations; Anuel AA received 11; and Farruko 10.

Complete list of nominees.

Awards

References

Billboard Latin Music Awards
2020 in Latin music
Billboard Latin Music Awards
2020 music awards
2020 in Florida